Christos Mikes (born 23 September 1971) is a Greek retired professional footballer who played as a defender.

Career
Mikes started his career with Zavlani. In 1989, he moved to Panachaiki, in where he played the next seven years. In 1996, he went to Kalamata and four years later, he moved to Ionikos.

The seasons 2003-04 and 2004-05 he played in Chalkidona F.C. and the season 2005-06 he played in Atromitos after the merge of two clubs. The next season, he moved to Veria,  in where remained only one season. The next years he continued in lower leagues, in Achilleas Kamaron and Niki Proastiou.

He was in the Greece national team that won the 1997 World Military Cup.

References

Greek footballers
Kalamata F.C. players
Ionikos F.C. players
Atromitos F.C. players
Chalkidona F.C. players
Super League Greece players
1971 births
Living people
Association football defenders
Footballers from Patras